Events in the year 1915 in Bulgaria.

Incumbents

Events 

 11 – 30 September – The mobilization of the Bulgarian Army on the eve of the Kingdom of Bulgaria's entry into World War I took place.

References 

 
1910s in Bulgaria
Years of the 20th century in Bulgaria
Bulgaria
Bulgaria